Caroline Mathilde may refer to:

Caroline Matilda of Great Britain (1751–1775)
Princess Caroline-Mathilde of Denmark (1912–1995)
Caroline Mathilde (ballet), a ballet to music by Sir Peter Maxwell Davies